Peter Martin Dalena (born June 26, 1960 in Fresno, California) is a former Major League Baseball designated hitter/pinch hitter who played for the Cleveland Indians in 1989. He weighed 200 pounds and was 5'11" in height. Dalena, who threw right-handed but batted left, attended Fresno State University.

Career
In  the New York Yankees drafted Dalena in the 27th round (690th overall) of the June Regular Phase amateur entry draft. As a free-agent, the Indians picked him up on November 22, .

On July 7, Dalena made his major league debut at the age of 29, wearing number 31. In 5 games (7 at-bats), he batted .143 with his only career hit being a double. He struck out three times. Dalena played his final major league game two weeks after his debut, on July 21.

External links

1960 births
Living people
American expatriate baseball players in Canada
Baseball players from California
Cleveland Indians players
Colorado Springs Sky Sox players
Columbus Clippers players
Fort Lauderdale Yankees players
Fresno State Bulldogs baseball players
Greensboro Hornets players
Nashville Sounds players
Portland Beavers players
Sportspeople from Fresno, California
Vancouver Canadians players